Jeff Laubenstein is a fantasy artist.

Career
Jeff Laubenstein has worked for several major Fantasy Game companies, including FASA, White Wolf, and Wizards of the Coast. He has been working in the field since the mid 80s. He was the art director on the Earthdawn project. Most of the Earthdawn books contained at least several of his contributions. In the early Shadowrun game books, his work featured prominently, illustrating nearly all of the NPC portraits.

Laubenstein was the art director at FASA for almost a decade. His art appears in numerous FASA releases, including MechWarrior: The Battletech Role Playing Game (1986), and Mercurial (Shadowrun) (1989).

He has done illustrations for Magic: The Gathering.

In 2001 he received a nomination for a Chesley Award, in the category Best Gaming-Related Illustration, for his work on Castles and Covenants (White Wolf Publishing).

References

External links 
 List of his published works

Fantasy artists
Living people
Place of birth missing (living people)
Role-playing game artists
Year of birth missing (living people)